Amigo(s) (Portuguese and Spanish for male friend) may refer to:

People
 Carlos Amigo Vallejo (1934-2022), Spanish Roman Catholic archbishop emeritus of Seville

Places

Facilities
 Amigos School, a bilingual primary school in Cambridge, Massachusetts, U.S.
 Los Amigos Biological Station, a research station in Peru
 Los Amigos High School, Fountain Valley, California, U.S.

Other places
 Amigo, West Virginia, U.S., an unincorporated community
 Los Amigos River, a river in Peru

Businesses and products
 Amigo (restaurant), a Hong Kong restaurant
 Amigo Comics, a Spanish comic book publisher
 Amigo Energy, an American retail electricity provider
 Amigo Holdings, a British lender
 Amigo Spiele, a German board and card game publisher
 Amigo Supermarkets, a chain of supermarkets in Puerto Rico
 Amigos Creations, an Indian film production company
 Amigos Library Services, an American company
 Isuzu Amigo, a compact SUV
 IGO amigo, a version of the navigation software platform iGO

Film, television and theatre
 Amigo (film), a 2010 film by John Sayles
 Amigos (film), a 2023 Indian Telugu-language action-thriller film 
 Deaf Smith & Johnny Ears, also known as Los Amigos, a 1972-73 spaghetti Western film
 Amigo (1980 film), a film starring Andrés García
 Amigo (TV series), a Norwegian game show for kids
 "¡Amigos!", an episode of Arrested Development
 Amigos (play), a 2004 play by David Williamson
 Amigo, a 2001 film by Erik Carrion, featuring Amaruk Kayshapanta
 The Amigos, a group of fictional penguins in the 2006 film Happy Feet

Music

Bands
Die Amigos, a German music band

Albums
 Amigo (Arlo Guthrie album), 1976
 Amigo (David Ball album), 2001
 Amigo (Kendji Girac album), 2018
 Amigos (Santana album), 1976
 Amigos (Paul Anka album), 1996
 Amigo, a 1990 album by Grupo Bronco
 Amigos, a 1989 album by Lindisfarne
 The Shinee World, 2008 album by South Korean boy band Shinee re-released as Amigo

Songs
 "Amigo", a 2001 song from the album Amigo (David Ball album)
 "Amigo" (Black Slate song), a 1980 song by Black Slate
 "Amigo", a 1954 song by Olavi Virta
 "Amigo", a 1998 song by Quickspace
 "Amigo", a 1978 song by Roberto Blanco
 "Amigo" (Shinee song), 2008
 "Amigo", a 1978 Spanish song by Roberto Carlos
 "Amigo", a song by Toque Profundo from Sueños Y Pesadillas Del 3er Mundo

Other uses
 Amigos de las Américas (AMIGOS), a non-profit organization
 AmiGO, a web-based search tool for the Gene Ontology project

See also
 Amiga (disambiguation)
 Amica (disambiguation)
 Amicus (disambiguation)
 Friends (disambiguation)
 Mi Amigo (disambiguation)
 Three Amigos (disambiguation)
 Tres Amigos (disambiguation)

Portuguese words and phrases
Spanish words and phrases